Tjaša Seme (born 18 November 1986) is a Slovenian rhythmic gymnast.

In national level, she's the three-time (2006, 2011, 2012) Slovenian National All-Around champion. She competed at the 2012 Gymnastics Olympic Test Event and placed 24th in All-Around qualifications, so she didn't get the ticket for Summer Olympic Games in summer.

Career
She competed at the  2009 World Championships in Mie, Japan, finishing 45th in All-around Qualifications (70.400). She helped team Slovenia place 16th in Team competition. She also qualified to Apparatus finals at the 2009 World Cup Maribor, placing 7th in Ball and Ribbon final.

References

External links
 
 

Living people
1986 births
Sportspeople from Ljubljana
Slovenian rhythmic gymnasts